David Clewell (February 11, 1955 – February 15, 2020) was an American poet and creative writing instructor at Webster University. From 2010–2012, he served as the Poet Laureate of Missouri.

Life
Clewell was born in New Brunswick, New Jersey in 1955 and attended Highland Park High School, in nearby Highland Park, where he first developed an interest in poetry. He graduated from University of Wisconsin with a B.A. in English. In 1979, he moved to St. Louis, Missouri and earned an M.F.A. in writing from Washington University in St. Louis. In 1985, Clewell began teaching in the English Department at Webster University. A year later, he started the Webster University Visiting Writers Series, which he still coordinated until his death.

As an instructor at Webster University, Clewell taught courses on 19th- and 20th-century literature, as well as poetry workshops and seminars. In 2010, Missouri Governor Jay Nixon noted that Clewell "has a unique perspective on contemporary American life and the characters and ideas that loom large in our recent history."

Clewell is the author of 10 poetry collections and his work has appeared in over 50 journals and magazines, including Harper's, Poetry, The Kenyon Review, The Missouri Review, The Georgia Review, Ontario Review, New Letters, and Yankee. He has been nominated for the Pushcart Prize for poetry seven times.

He was the poet laureate for the state of Missouri, serving until 2012. He passed the poetic torch to Will Trowbridge.

He lived in Webster Groves, Missouri with his wife Patricia.

Awards
 Pollak Poetry Prize for Now We're Getting Somewhere
 Lavan Poetry Prize from the Academy of American Poets
 1989 National Poetry Series, for Blessings in Disguise
2017 Lifetime Achievement in the Arts from the Webster Groves (MO) Arts Commission

Works

Poems
"from Jack Ruby's America", Word Virtual, 1999
"The Accomplice", Counterbalance, April 9, 2007

Poetry collections

Anthologies

References

External links
"DAVID CLEWELL", Poetry Dispatch, No. 263, December 31, 2008
"Words That Matter: David Clewell", Playback, Kyle Beachy, 16 December 2005
"Huetato Warrior", YouTube, David Clewell and Benjamin Clewell, 07 November 2009

American male poets
Poets from New Jersey
1955 births
2020 deaths
Highland Park High School (New Jersey) alumni
People from Highland Park, New Jersey
Poets Laureate of Missouri
Webster University faculty
Writers from New Brunswick, New Jersey
People from Webster Groves, Missouri
Washington University in St. Louis alumni
University of Wisconsin–Madison College of Letters and Science alumni
20th-century American poets
20th-century American male writers
21st-century American poets
21st-century American male writers